Haji Juma Sereweji (born 5 February 1948) is a Tanzanian CCM politician and Member of Parliament for Mwanakwerekwe constituency since 2010.

References

1948 births
Living people
Tanzanian Muslims
Chama Cha Mapinduzi MPs
Tanzanian MPs 2010–2015